Sagar Nagar is a neighborhood of the city of Visakhapatnam, Andhra Pradesh, India, on the coast of the Bay of Bengal.

About
Sagar Nagar is located between Bheemunipatnam and Visakhapatnam beach road.

Transport
This residential area is well connected with Dwaraka Nagar and Dwaraka bus station.

References

Neighbourhoods in Visakhapatnam